The 2010 FIA WTCC Race of Brazil (formally the 2010 FIA WTCC HSBC Race of Brazil) was a World Touring Car Championship round held at Autódromo Internacional de Curitiba near Curitiba, Brazil on 7 March 2010. It was the opening round of the 2010 World Touring Car Championship season and the fifth running of the FIA WTCC Race of Brazil. The two races were won by Yvan Muller of Chevrolet and Gabriele Tarquini of SR-Sport

Background
Reigning manufacturer's champion SEAT withdrew from the series for the 2010 season. Former SEAT Sport drivers Gabriele Tarquini, Tiago Monteiro and Jordi Gené transferred to new team SR-Sport, run by SUNRED Engineering. BMW reduced their team from five cars to two, with Augusto Farfus joining Andy Priaulx at BMW Team RBM. Chevrolet continue to run three cars, with Yvan Muller replacing Nicola Larini in their line-up. Lada were absent from the opening round of the season. Fredy Barth made his WTCC debut for SUNRED, while Harry Vaulkhard and Darryl O'Young made their first appearances with new team bamboo-engineering.

This was also the first round for the new points system introduced in Formula One. The winning driver would score 25 points, with points going down to tenth place. Points would therefore be awarded 25–18–15–12–10–8–6–4–2–1.

Report

Testing and free practice
BMW Team RBM driver Farfus was fastest in Friday's test session with Chevrolet driver Alain Menu second and Farfus' team mate Priaulx third. Tarquini was the fastest SR–Sport driver in sixth, his team mate Jordi Gené stopped early on with steering problems.

BMW stayed on top in free practice one on Saturday morning, with 1–2 with Farfus first and Priaulx second. Huff was the fastest Chevrolet while newcomer and privateer Norbert Michelisz was the lead SEAT. The session was stopped early when Vaulkhard brought out the red flags with three minutes remaining.

SR–Sport and Tarquini was quickest in free practice two, less than five hundredths of a second ahead of Farfus. Priaulx was third and Muller was fourth in the fastest of the Chevrolets. The leading independent was Franz Engstler while Vaulkhard took to the track near the end of the session after repairs to his car following his practice one crash.

Qualifying
Chevrolet dominated the first qualifying session of the season. Rob Huff was fastest in Q1 ahead of teammates Alain Menu and Yvan Muller.

Muller set the fastest time in Q2, clinching pole position, while Menu and Huff were third and fourth. SR-Sport's Jordi Gené separated the Chevrolet's by setting the second fastest time. Gabriele Tarquini was fifth, ahead of the BMW's of Andy Priaulx and Augusto Farfus, which had set the pace in the testing and practice sessions earlier in the weekend.

Warm-Up
After rain fell overnight, the Sunday morning warm–up session took place on a drying track. Priaulx was fastest while pole sitter Muller was fourth. The session was cut short when Tom Coronel went off the track with two minutes remaining.

Race One
A torrential downpour shortly before the start of the race led to the first two laps of the race being run behind the safety car. As Muller led the field through the opening corners after they were released, Gené ran wide and lost places to Huff and Menu, before running wide again and dropping to tenth.

Muller led his teammates home for a Chevrolet 1-2-3 on his debut for the team. Reigning champion Tarquini finished fourth, ahead of Andy Priaulx. Augusto Farfus finished sixth after a battle with Tom Coronel that saw the Dutchman drop to eighth behind a recovering Gené. Fredy Barth finished ninth on his world championship debut, after passing Norbert Michelisz on the penultimate lap. Sergio Hernández was top Independent in 13th overall, after starting at the back of the field. He took advantage of contact between class leaders Stefano D'Aste and Darryl O'Young to win.

Race Two
Tarquini led an SR–Sport 1–2 ahead of Gené. Tarquini had fought off an attack from Priaulx at the first corner, causing the BMW driver to head to the pits for repairs. Gené led the race until lap three until he was passed by Tarquini and the two distanced from the Chevrolet trio of Huff, Menu and Muller. Huff then ran wide and got back on track ahead of Farfus, Huff defended to stay ahead until the finish. Hernández was the winning independent while Priaulx and Coronel were the only two retirements, pole sitter Coronel having retired after contact with Huff on the first lap.

Results

Qualifying

Race 1

Bold denotes Fastest lap.

Race 2

Bold denotes Fastest lap.

Standings after the event

Drivers' Championship standings

Yokohama Independents' Trophy standings

Manufacturers' Championship standings

 Note: Only the top five positions are included for both sets of drivers' standings.

References

Results Booklet PDF at MST Systems

External links
World Touring Car Championship official website

Brazil
FIA WTCC Race of Brazil